Lenard Benoit Benjamin [be-NOYT] (born November 22, 1964) is an American former professional basketball player who was selected by the Los Angeles Clippers in the 1st round (3rd overall) of the 1985 NBA Draft. A 7'0" center from Creighton University, Benjamin played for nine NBA teams in 15 seasons from 1985 to 1999. He played for the Clippers (1985–91), Seattle SuperSonics (1991–93), Los Angeles Lakers (1993, 1999 preseason), New Jersey Nets (1993–95), Vancouver Grizzlies (1995), Milwaukee Bucks (1995–96), Toronto Raptors (1996), Philadelphia 76ers (1998–99) and Cleveland Cavaliers (1999).

Career
Benjamin's best year as a professional came during the 1988–89 NBA season as a member of the Clippers, appearing in 79 games and averaging 16.4 ppg. It was also during this season that some criticized Benjamin’s on-court actions, as famously exemplified by television announcer Dick Vitale after a January 1988 game against the Milwaukee Bucks: “He has a double zero on his back, but he should add another zero. I give him a zero for his offensive attitude, a zero for his defensive attitude, and a zero for his mental attitude ... he’s an absolute, flat-out disgrace to everyone that’s ever worn a basketball uniform.”

In his NBA career, he had a .541 field goal percentage, recorded 4,604 defensive rebounds and 1,581 blocks and averaged 11.4 points and 2.0 blocks per game. Benjamin also played briefly in the Continental Basketball Association (CBA) in the latter part of his career. In 8 games over two seasons with the Yakima Sun Kings and Grand Rapids Hoops, he averaged 10.9 points and 8.8 rebounds per contest.

He is the Clippers' career leader in blocked shots (1,117) and in blocked shots per game (2.75).

NBA career statistics

Regular season

|-
| align="left" | 1985–86
| align="left" | Los Angeles
| 79 || 37 || 26.4 || .490 || .333 || .746 || 7.6 || 1.0 || 0.8 || 2.6 || 11.1
|-
| align="left" | 1986–87
| align="left" | Los Angeles
| 72 || 61 || 31.0 || .449 || .000 || .715 || 8.1 || 1.9 || 0.8 || 2.6 || 11.5
|-
| align="left" | 1987–88
| align="left" | Los Angeles
| 66 || 59 || 32.9 || .491 || .000 || .706 || 8.0 || 2.6 || 0.8 || 3.4 || 13.0
|-
| align="left" | 1988–89
| align="left" | Los Angeles
| 79 || 62 || 32.7 || .541 || .000 || .744 || 8.8 || 2.0 || 0.7 || 2.8 || 16.4
|-
| align="left" | 1989–90
| align="left" | Los Angeles
| 71 || 58 || 32.6 || .526 || .000 || .732 || 9.3 || 2.2 || 0.8 || 2.6 || 13.5
|-
| align="left" | 1990–91
| align="left" | Los Angeles
| 39 || 38 || 34.3 || .492 || .000 || .728 || 12.0 || 1.9 || 0.7 || 2.3 || 14.9
|-
| align="left" | 1990–91
| align="left" | Seattle
| 31 || 27 || 29.0 || .502 || .000 || .690 || 8.2 || 1.5 || 0.9 || 1.7 || 12.9
|-
| align="left" | 1991–92
| align="left" | Seattle
| 63 || 61 || 30.8 || .478 || .000 || .687 || 8.1 || 1.2 || 0.6 || 1.9 || 14.0
|-
| align="left" | 1992–93
| align="left" | Seattle
| 31 || 6 || 14.5 || .497 || .000 || .701 || 3.6 || 0.4 || 0.5 || 1.1 || 6.7
|-
| align="left" | 1992–93
| align="left" | Los Angeles
| 28 || 0 || 10.9 || .481 || .000 || .595 || 3.4 || 0.4 || 0.5 || 0.5 || 4.5
|-
| align="left" | 1993–94
| align="left" | New Jersey
| 77 || 74 || 23.6 || .480 || .000 || .710 || 6.5 || 0.6 || 0.5 || 1.2 || 9.3
|-
| align="left" | 1994–95
| align="left" | New Jersey
| 61 || 57 || 26.2 || .510 || .000 || .760 || 7.2 || 0.6 || 0.4 || 1.0 || 11.1
|-
| align="left" | 1995–96
| align="left" | Vancouver
| 13 || 13 || 31.1 || .441 || .000 || .696 || 7.9 || 1.2 || 0.8 || 1.2 || 13.9
|-
| align="left" | 1995–96
| align="left" | Milwaukee
| 70 || 58 || 21.3 || .520 || .000 || .732 || 6.2 || 0.7 || 0.5 || 1.0 || 7.8
|-
| align="left" | 1996–97
| align="left" | Toronto
| 4 || 3 || 11.0 || .417 || .000 || .750 || 2.3 || 0.3 || 0.3 || 0.0 || 3.3
|-
| align="left" | 1997–98
| align="left" | Philadelphia
| 14 || 0 || 14.1 || .537 || .000 || .633 || 3.8 || 0.2 || 0.3 || 0.3 || 4.5
|-
| align="left" | 1998–99
| align="left" | Philadelphia
| 6 || 0 || 5.5 || .286 || .000 || .000 || 1.3 || 0.2 || 0.0 || 0.0 || 0.7
|-
| align="left" | 1999–00
| align="left" | Cleveland
| 3 || 0 || 2.7 || .333 || .000 || .000 || 0.3 || 0.0 || 0.0 || 0.3 || 0.7
|- class="sortbottom"
| style="text-align:center;" colspan="2"| Career
| 807 || 614 || 27.2 || .497 || .048 || .721 || 7.5 || 1.3 || 0.6 || 2.0 || 11.4
|}

Playoffs

|-
| align="left" | 1990–91
| align="left" | Seattle
| 5 || 5 || 32.6 || .488 || .000 || .906 || 6.6 || 0.2 || 0.6 || 2.6 || 13.8
|-
| align="left" | 1991–92
| align="left" | Seattle
| 9 || 4 || 17.9 || .561 || .000 || .500 || 5.1 || 0.6 || 0.6 || 1.4 || 6.1
|-
| align="left" | 1993–94
| align="left" | New Jersey
| 4 || 4 || 27.0 || .412 || .000 || .875 || 5.3 || 0.3 || 0.5 || 2.0 || 5.3
|- class="sortbottom"
| style="text-align:center;" colspan="2"| Career
| 18 || 13 || 24.0 || .505 || .000 || .776 || 5.6 || 0.4 || 0.6 || 1.9 || 8.1
|}

See also
List of National Basketball Association career blocks leaders
List of National Basketball Association players with 10 or more blocks in a game

References

1964 births
Living people
All-American college men's basketball players
American expatriate basketball people in Canada
Basketball players from Louisiana
Centers (basketball)
Cleveland Cavaliers players
Creighton Bluejays men's basketball players
Grand Rapids Hoops players
Los Angeles Clippers draft picks
Los Angeles Clippers players
Los Angeles Lakers players
McDonald's High School All-Americans
Milwaukee Bucks players
New Jersey Nets players
Parade High School All-Americans (boys' basketball)
Philadelphia 76ers players
Seattle SuperSonics players
Sportspeople from Monroe, Louisiana
Toronto Raptors players
Vancouver Grizzlies expansion draft picks
Vancouver Grizzlies players
Yakima Sun Kings players
American men's basketball players